The Tuzla Infantry School Command is located in Tuzla district of Istanbul. A military school that trains officers, non-commissioned officers and specialist sergeants belonging to the infantry class under the Turkish Land Forces Education and Doctrine Command (EDOK). It is Turkey's first and only infantry school.

Overview 
Founded in 1909, the school moved to Çankırı in 1941 and was named Infantry School in 1946. In 1961, it was moved to the Tuzla district of Istanbul. Courses are composed of the regiment command and the sub-units of the demonstration and exercise battalion command, and the class training of the infantry class officers, non-commissioned officers, specialist sergeants and lieutenants occur in the school. Trainings are given on subjects such as the use of infantry fighting vehicles and marksmanship.

PKK attack 

On February 12, 1994, a bomb was placed in a garbage container at the Tuzla Train Station by militants of the Kurdistan Workers' Party (PKK). As a result, 2 reserve officer candidate students and 3 soldiers were killed while waiting for a train at the station to go on leave.

Notable alumni 

 Hikmat Hasanov, an Azerbaijani major general who is the commander of the 1st Army Corps of Azerbaijan.

See also 

 Turkish War Academies
 School of Infantry
 United States Army Infantry School

External links 

 Official website

References 
Turkish Land Forces
Tuzla, Istanbul
Military education and training in Turkey